Ernesto Emilio Duchini (November 10, 1910 – March 19, 2006) was an Argentine footballer and later a football coach. He was part of the coaching team that led Argentina to the FIFA World Youth Championship in 1979.

Duchini was born in the Barrio Norte district of Buenos Aires on November 10, 1910, at a young age his family moved to Chacarita where he joined the youth team of Chacarita Juniors in 1922. He made his debut in 1928 and played for the club until his retirement in 1938.

After retiring as a player Duchini became a coach, he took charge of Chacarita Juniors in 1939 and in 1941 he led the team to the Argentine 2nd Division championship. he stayed with the club until 1943.

During the 1940s, 1950s and 1960s he worked as a youth coach at San Lorenzo, Racing Club, River Plate and Independiente.

In 1954 he was appointed youth coach for the Argentina national team, a position he held for 20 years. During his reign he won the Pan American Games in 1955 and 1959.

In 1974, he became assessor of youth development, a position he held until 1994. He was part of the coaching team that led the Argentina under 20 team to their first World Youth Championship in 1979. 

Duchini died on March 19, 2006, at the age of 95 in the Pirovano Hospital, he is buried in the La Chacarita Cemetery.

Titles

As coach 
 Chacarita Juniors
 Primera B (1): 1941
 Argentina
 Pan American Games (1): 1959

References

External links

 Obituary in Clarín

1910 births
2006 deaths
Footballers from Buenos Aires
Argentine footballers
Association football midfielders
Chacarita Juniors footballers
Argentine football managers
Chacarita Juniors managers
Burials at La Chacarita Cemetery